"Anymore" is a song by British singer Melanie C, recorded for her seventh studio album Version of Me (2016). A departure from the pop rock sound on her previous albums, the uptempo electropop song was selected as the album's lead single and premiered on radio presenter Chris Evans' BBC Radio 2 breakfast show on September 6, 2016. It has since reached number one on the UK Physical Singles Chart Top 100 chart.

Music video
An accompanying music video, directed by  Dave East, was released online shortly after its radio debut on September 6, 2016 and made available for stream and download on a day later. It sees the singer lose herself in the music at a club, intercut by other scenes showing other people dancing.

Charts

Weekly charts

References

External links
 

2016 singles
2016 songs
Melanie C songs
Songs written by Adam Argyle
Songs written by Melanie C